Ripley High School may refer to:

 Ripley High School (Mississippi), Ripley, Mississippi
 Ripley High School (Oklahoma), Ripley, Oklahoma
 Ripley High School (Tennessee), Ripley, Tennessee
 Ripley High School (West Virginia), Ripley, West Virginia
 Ripley-Union-Lewis-Huntington High School, Ripley, Ohio
 South Ripley High School, Versailles, Indiana